The Ridges Sanctuary is a  nature preserve and land trust in Baileys Harbor, Wisconsin. It is listed as a National Natural Landmark, Important Bird Area and Wisconsin State Natural Area. It was founded in 1937 and was the first land trust in the state.

The sanctuary is also home to the Baileys Harbor Range Lights, which were added to the National Register of Historic Places in 1989.

The Cook-Albert Fuller Nature Center opened in 2015. The 7,400-square foot facility is LEED certified, and includes displays about the preserve's karst topography, wildflowers, plants, animals and the history of the site's founding.

The sanctuary includes a small amount of the raw humus rendzina soil type, which is globally uncommon. and is also found in the Marshall's Point State Natural Area, a residential development not open to the public.

Orchid project 
Although the sanctuary is home to wild orchids, it also operates an orchid restoration project to cultivate and introduce rare orchids into otherwise natural plant communities. 25 native orchid species are currently kept at the Ridges. A 1998 survey of wild, native orchids was carried out in response to continued theft of the sanctuary orchids. 28 species were identified.

Climate

Gallery

See also 
 Jens Jensen
 Emma Toft

References

External links
 The Ridges Sanctuary
 Trail Map
 Baileys Harbor Ridges Park Beach description in Door County Outdoors: A Guide to the Best Hiking, Biking, Paddling, Beaches, and Natural Places by Magill Weber, Madison, Wisconsin: University of Wisconsin Press, 2011, page 115
 Baileys Harbor Ridges County Park, Door County Facilities and Parks Department
 Ridges Sanctuary Group Organized, Door County Advocate, October 22, 1937
Ridges Road: A History with Leean Despotes by the Baileys Harbor Historical Society, Sevestopol TV, June 18, 2015
The Ridges Sanctuary with Steve Leonard by the Baileys Harbor Historical Society, Sevestopol TV, August 21, 2012

Protected areas of Door County, Wisconsin
National Natural Landmarks in Wisconsin
Nature centers in Wisconsin
Land trusts in the United States
Nature reserves in Wisconsin
1967 establishments in Wisconsin
Environmental organizations established in 1967
State Natural Areas of Wisconsin